Franklin is a city and the county seat of Venango County, Pennsylvania. The population was 6,097 in the 2020 census. Franklin is part of the Oil City, PA Micropolitan Statistical Area. 

Franklin is known for its three-day autumn festival in October, Applefest, which attracts hundreds of thousands of visitors.

History 
Franklin is located at the confluence of French Creek and the Allegheny River, an important site used for centuries by Native Americans. They had long before developed what became known as the Venango Path, passing from the head of French Creek north to Presque Isle Bay on Lake Erie. Via French Creek and the Allegheny River, the portage effectively linked the waterways of the Ohio River and the Great Lakes. 

In 1740, Scottish fur trader John Fraser built a trading post here at  Venango, the Lenape village. The French also had designs on this region. 

They wanted to link their colonies of New France (Quebec) north of the Great Lakes, in Illinois Country (accessible via the Ohio River}, and La Louisiane, on the lower Mississippi River. As tensions increased between France and Great Britain prior to the onset of the French and Indian War (as the North American front of the Seven Years' War was called), the French constructed four forts to control their continued access to the Venango Path and these important waterways. From north to south they were Fort Presque Isle, Fort Le Boeuf (at the south end of the portage and head of French Creek), Fort Machault, and Fort Duquesne, at the Forks of the Ohio. 

In December 1753, George Washington, then a 21-year-old major in the Virginia militia, was sent to Fort Le Boeuf to warn the French that they were trespassing on British land and should leave. Although providing respite to Washington and his party, the fort commander gave him a letter suggesting that the Governor of Virginia should instead deliver his message to the French commander in Quebec, New France. 

The French maintained this and their other three forts, including at Fort Machault until July 1759, when they surrendered Fort Niagara to the British. At that time, the commander of Fort Presque Isle sent orders to the commanders of Fort Le Boeuf and Fort Machault to abandon their positions and return north. Before leaving, the French troops burned both of these forts to the ground to prevent their use by the British. 

In 1760, the British erected Fort Venango here, replacing Fort Marchault. In 1763, Native Americans allied with the French killed many British. The British colonists had repeatedly attacked even neutral tribes, such as the Lenape, who then mostly allied with the French. After the war, the British Americans constructed Fort Franklin here, named after Benjamin Franklin. 

In 1787 Andrew Ellicott, who surveyed Washington, D.C., was hired to lay out the town of Franklin, which had developed around the fort. It became a trading center for a largely rural, agricultural region. Once oil was discovered in the late 19th century in nearby Titusville, Franklin became a booming oil town. After other fields were discovered in Texas and Oklahoma, and oil companies moved west, Franklin developed an industry of machinery companies.

Geography
Franklin is located at  (41.3978, -79.8314).

Climate

Demographics

As of the census of 2018, there were 6,078 people, 2,989 households, and 1,814 families residing in the city. The population density was 1,560.2 people per square mile (602.7/km2). There were 3,293 housing units at an average density of 709.8 per square mile (274.2/km2). The racial makeup of the city was 95.18% White, 3.19% African American, 0.04% Native American, 0.23% Asian, 0.01% Pacific Islander, 0.31% from other races, and 1.37% from two or more races. Hispanic or Latino of any race were 0.67% of the population.

There were 2,989 households, out of which 27.3% had children under the age of 18 living with them, 38.8% were married couples living together, 14.6% had a female householder with no husband present, and 39.8% were non-families. 35.5% of all households were made up of individuals, and 17.4% had someone living alone who was 65 years of age or older. The average household size was 2.27 and the average family size was 2.94.

In the city, the population was spread out, with 23.8% under the age of 18, 8.8% from 18 to 24, 25.9% from 25 to 44, 23.1% from 45 to 64, and 18.5% who were 65 years of age or older. The median age was 40 years. For every 100 females, there were 86.0 males. For every 100 females age 18 and over, there were 83.5 males.

The median income for a household in the city was $23,818, and the median income for a family was $34,718. Males had a median income of $32,912 versus $21,178 for females. The per capita income for the city was $15,234. About 13.6% of families and 17.3% of the population were below the poverty line, including 25.4% of those under age 18 and 14.4% of those age 65 or over.

Education
 The Franklin Area School District currently has one high school, one middle school, and three elementary schools (Central Elementary, Sandycreek Elementary, and Victory Elementary) located throughout the area with an estimated 2278 students.
 The Valley Grove School District currently has one high school and one elementary school located in the Franklin area with an estimated 1026 students. It formerly consisted of one high school, one middle school and two elementary schools, but a consolidation and rebuilding project converted the middle school into a single elementary school that reopened in 2007.

Transportation
 Venango Regional Airport

Tourism 
Allegheny River Trail

DeBence Antique Music World

St John's Episcopal Church

Sports
In 1903, the city was the home of the Franklin Athletic Club, one of the earliest professional football teams. That season, the team was unofficially recognized as the "US Football Champions" and later won the 1903 World Series of Football, held that December at Madison Square Garden. The team included several of the era's top players, such as: Herman Kerchoff, Arthur McFarland, Clark Schrontz, Paul Steinberg, Pop Sweet, Eddie Wood, and coach Blondy Wallace.

Among other sporting accomplishments, Franklin Area High School has won two state basketball championships. In 2001 and 2006, the boys team, playing in PIAA Class AAA District 10, defeated Allentown Central Catholic out of District 11 and Communications Tech from District 12 (Philadelphia Public League), respectively.

Notable people
 Timothy A. Barrow (January 1, 1934 – March 16, 2019), Arizona businessman and politician
 John Wilkes Booth (May 10, 1838 – April 26, 1865) Abraham Lincoln's assassin. In 1864, he formed an oil company in Franklin and resided there while performing at the Franklin Opera House.
 Nate Byham (born June 27, 1988), NFL tight end formerly of the San Francisco 49ers
 Jack Fultz (born August 27, 1948), winner of the 1976 Boston Marathon.
 Alexander Hays (July 8, 1819 – May 5, 1864), USMA graduate and Union general during the Civil War. Meritorious service at Gettysburg. Killed at the Battle of the Wilderness.
Samuel Hays (1783–1868), U.S. Congressman
 Nate Karns (born November 25, 1987) MLB pitcher for the Baltimore Orioles
 Judge Robert Lamberton (March 20, 1809 – August 7, 1885), associate judge of the Courts of Venango County, Pennsylvania and founder of the Lamberton Savings Bank
 Rolland Lawrence (born March 24, 1951), NFL cornerback for the Atlanta Falcons
 Hildegarde Dolson Lockridge (1908–1981), author of mysteries and histories, including We Shook the Family Tree
 Ted Marchibroda (March 15, 1931 – January 16, 2016), NFL quarterback and head coach in the National Football League
 Alexander McDowell (March 4, 1845 – September 30, 1913), member of the United States House of Representatives
 Charles Miller (June 15, 1843 – December 21, 1927), businessman and commander of the Pennsylvania National Guard Division.
 Jesse L. Reno (April 20, 1823 – September 14, 1862), United States Army major general; Killed at the Battle of South Mountain
 George C. Rickards (August 25, 1860 – January 15, 1933), major general in the United States Army and Chief of the National Guard Bureau
 Sean W. Rowe (born 1975), Bishop of the Episcopal Diocese of Northwestern Pennsylvania
 George R. Snowden (February 12, 1841 – April 21, 1932), major general in the Pennsylvania National Guard and commander of the Pennsylvania National Guard Division
Mary Jo White (born 1941) – Pennsylvania state senator
 John A. Wiley (September 3, 1843 – December 28, 1909), National Guard major general who commanded the 28th Infantry Division
 Howard Zahniser (February 25, 1906 – May 5, 1964), environmental activist who authored the Wilderness Act
Kid Butler, MLB player
Richard Frame, politician
Bill Slocum, politician
Joseph C. Sibley an American livestock breeder, farmer, and politician who represented northwestern Pennsylvania in the United States House of Representatives for five terms.

References

External links

 

Cities in Pennsylvania
Cities in Venango County, Pennsylvania
County seats in Pennsylvania
Populated places established in the 1740s
1795 establishments in Pennsylvania